Peppered moray can refer to either of these species of fish:
 Gymnothorax griseus
 Gymnothorax pictus
 Uropterygius polystictus